RV Rachel Carson is the name of four research vessels, named after the American marine biologist and conservationist Rachel Carson.

 , a former naval gunboat, acquired by the Environmental Protection Agency in 1977 and later scrapped.
 , a former supply vessel, acquired by the Monterey Bay Aquarium Research Institute in 2011.
 , a Challenger-class research vessel, launched in 2008 and operated by the University of Maryland.
 , a former fisheries research vessel, launched in 2003 and acquired in 2017 by the University of Washington.

Ship names